Robin Hood Rescuing Three Squires or Robin Hood and the Widow's Three Sons is a traditional ballad about Robin Hood, listed as Child ballad 140 and Roud 70.

Synopsis
Robin meets an old woman lamenting that her sons will hang for poaching the king's deer. He persuades an old man to trade his ragged clothing for Robin's fine clothes, and in this disguise, offers to be the sheriff's hangman. He blows on his horn, and his men arrive. In some variants, they hang the sheriff instead of the three young men; in all, they all escape back to the greenwood.

Influences
Francis James Child believed this to be the source of Robin Hood Rescuing Will Stutly.

Adaptations
Howard Pyle retold this story in The Merry Adventures of Robin Hood with the hero as Little John; he used trickery to get the three young men away, and his bow broke, resulting in his own capture. Robin Hood, having just killed Guy of Gisbourne, disguises himself as Guy to carry out the rescue.

See also
Robin Hood and the Beggar, I

References

External links
Robin Hood Rescuing Three Squires
Robin Hood and the Widow's Three Sons

Child Ballads
Robin Hood ballads